Yurochkino is a rural locality (a village) in Yurochenskoye Rural Settlement, Sheksninsky District, Vologda Oblast, Russia. The population was 172 as of 2002. There are 4 streets.

Geography 
Yurochkino is located 31 km south of Sheksna (the district's administrative centre) by road. Khanevo is the nearest rural locality.

References 

Rural localities in Sheksninsky District